Israelitische Religionsgesellschaft Zürich (literally: Israeli Religious Society Zurich, in Hebrew: עדת ישורון ציריך), commonly shortened to IRGZ, is one of two Hareidi communities in Zurich. 

The community has approximately 350 members, and it has been a member of the Schweizerische Israelitische Gemeindebund (SIG, literally Swiss Federation of Israelite Communities) since 1918. 

The community was founded in 1895 as an unofficial organization, and at its inception it was part of the Israelitische Cultusgemeinde Zürich (ICZ).  Three years later, it separated from the ICZ due to disagreements over the level of religiosity. Already in 1890, Josua Goldschmidt, Josef Ettlinger and Isidor Kohn started their own minyan in Zurich.  Because of their strictly Orthodox worldview, they no longer wanted to participate in the ICZ.  Lepold Weill gave them a room to use in his residence, which they used to start the new community.

The communities is committed to the values of neo-Orthodoxy as established by Rabbi Samson Rafael Hirsch in the 19th century. It is the only German-speaking community with this ideology that has existed uninterrupted for the last century. In the main shul, they are particular that prayers are pronounced using the Western European/German pronunciation of Hebrew. They use Rödelheim prayer books, and recite almost all of the piyyutim in the Western Ashkenazic rite. In the beginning of the 20th century, immigrants from Eastern Europe began to arrive in Zurich. The later is also a Hareidi community, but they pray according to Nusach Sefard. Nevertheless, since the 1960s, there is a lot of cooperation between the communities, especially in the realm of Kashrut supervision.

Facilities of the community
The community has a large Synagogue on Freigutstrasse, which was designed by the architects  in the Art Deco style.  There is also a community center in Brandschenkesteig, and a cemetery in the town of Fällanden. There are also schools for boys and girls closely associated with the community, but under separate auspices.

External links
Official website of the IRG (German)

References 

Religious organizations established in 1895
History of Zürich
Jewish communities
1895 establishments in Switzerland
Jewish Swiss history